The Santa Ysabel Band of Diegueño Mission Indians of the Santa Ysabel Reservation is a federally recognized tribe of Kumeyaay Indians, who are sometimes known as Mission Indians.

Reservation
The Santa Ysabel Reservation is a federal reservation, located in northeastern San Diego County, California, near the mountain towns of Santa Ysabel and Julian. The reservation was founded in 1893 and is  large. 110 people of 300 enrolled members lived there in the 1970s.
The Santa Ysabel Indian Reservation ranges from 3,200 feet to 5,700 feet in elevation and it comprises a land base of over 15,000 acres on three tracts of land. The mountainous topography of the Reservation is home to a wide variety of indigenous plants and trees, including seven different species of oak trees, musky sage plants, verdant wild ferns, vibrantly blue lilacs, and waves of golden poppies that flourish along the hillsides and ridges of Volcan Mountain. The Santa Ysabel Reservation enjoys four beautiful seasons every year, with blossoming springs, warm summers, colorful and breezy autumns, and snow in most winters.

Government
The Iipay Nation of Santa Ysabel is recognized by the United States Government as a Sovereign Government. The Santa Ysabel Band is headquartered in Santa Ysabel, California. They are governed by a democratically elected tribal council. Bernice Paipa is their current tribal chairperson and Brandie Taylor is the vice chairwoman. Paipa succeeded Virgil Perez in office. In 2007 the Iipay Nation of Santa Ysabel established their Constitution in order to preserve and protect their culture, lands, and rights, and to promote equality and justice. The power of government is divided into four branches: General Council, Legislative, Executive, and Judicial. The General Council is the Supreme governing body of the Nation, and consists of over 700 adult voting members. The Executive Branch is composed of a Chairman and Vice-Chairman; The Chairman and Vice-Chairman seek office as a team, and serve four year terms. The Legislative Branch consists of seven Legislators; Legislators serve two and four year staggered terms.

Economic development
The tribe owned and operated the Santa Ysabel Resort and Casino and the Orchard Restaurant and the Seven Oaks Bar and Grill, located in Santa Ysabel until they went out of business on February 3, 2014 after being denied chapter 11 bankruptcy. They established Santa Ysabel Interactive and launched the I-gaming poker website Private Table at www.privatetable.com to offer Class II gaming to customers through Internet servers located on tribal lands. In offering online gaming through Santa Ysabel Interactive, the Tribe is exerting its sovereign right under the Indian Gaming Regulatory Act (IGRA) to regulate and conduct Class II gaming from the tribe's reservation.

Activities
In mid-November every year, the tribe celebrates a Feast Day at Santa Ysabel Asistencia.

References

 Eargle, Jr., Dolan H. California Indian Country: The Land and the People. San Francisco: Tree Company Press, 1992. .
 Pritzker, Barry M. A Native American Encyclopedia: History, Culture, and Peoples. Oxford: Oxford University Press, 2000. .
 Shipek, Florence C. "History of Southern California Mission Indians." Handbook of North American Indians. Volume ed, Heizer, Robert F. Washington, DC: Smithsonian Institution, 1978. 610-618. .

External links
Iipay Nation of Santa Ysabel 

Kumeyaay
California Mission Indians
Native American tribes in San Diego County, California
Native American tribes in California
Federally recognized tribes in the United States